Senator Lynn may refer to:

Evelyn J. Lynn (born 1930), Florida State Senate
Julia Lynn (born 1957), Kansas State Senate

See also
Senator Lyon (disambiguation)